Oleksandr Serhiyovych Pedan (Ukrainian: Олесандр Сергійович Педан born March 24, 1982, Khmelnytsky ) is a Ukrainian showman and TV presenter.

Biography 
His father Serhii Yosypovych and mother Valentina Nikolaevna met in the dance ensemble at the university. Olexander became their third child, he has two older brothers. After graduating from school, he entered the Faculty of Economics of Khmelnitsky National University. In 2004 he received the diploma of "manager-economist". In 2006 he moved to Kyiv. Oleksandr met with her future wife Inna in the 9th grade during the school's KVN. Then they met again in student years. And since then they have not parted. In 2003, the couple married. In 2010 started playing football in the team of FC Maestro.

Career 
Alexander dreamed of becoming an actor from childhood, at school, he was a participant in amateur performances. Completed the Theater Department of Khmelnytsky School of Arts. 13 years engaged in Ukrainian dance because his father was a choreographer of the Ukrainian Dance Ensemble.

Nine years, Alexander dedicated to KVN. At 16 he became a member of Khmelnytsky National University team. He takes part in the tournaments of the Association of KVN of Ukraine in the team "Stylish Wind" and "TM-TV". He played for the TV team of the Higher Ukrainian League KVN "Three fat women", the main part of which were experienced players. Having joined the team as a dancer, Pedan quickly became one of the leaders,  an active participant in the creative process – writing texts, setting numbers. He participated in a number of international festivals of the Club (Sochi, Jurmala).

In 2006 Alexander became the leading Comedy Club UA, as well as a member of the club's weekly parties and TV broadcasts. The bright individual image of the entertainer gave him the creative pseudonym – Alexander "Angel" Pedan.

In 2008, Pedan became one of the leading morning show "Rise" on the Novyi Kanal in partnership with Freimuth and Prytula. This trinity of the leading is called one of the most successful all-time existence of the morning show on the Novyi Kanal. Together with Olga and Serhiy, Alexander led the "Rise" until May 2011.

2008 led TV show "Ukraine does not believe in tears" with Masha Efrosinina and Serhiy Prytula. 2010–2011 – became a participant of the show "Make me funny" with Serhiy Prytula, Masha Efrosinina, Dmitry Kolyadenko, Andriy Domansky, Anastasiya Kassilova and Sergey Kuzin.

2010–2011 – became the judge of the show "Sing, if you can" with the leading Serhiy Prytula and Masha Efrosinina. 2011 – became the leader of the extreme show "I am the Hero!" With Serhiy Prytula and the world champion in gymnastics Lilia Podkopaeva. In the same year, Alexander becomes the lead show "Intuition" – his first solo project on the Novyi Kanal.

2010 – became the creator and co-founder of the sports and music festival Z-games. By 2013, the festival was held within the Kazantip festival in Crimea, since 2014 it takes place in the Gulf of Odessa region. In 2015, this festival gathered a record number of sports enthusiasts – more than 10 thousand.

March–June 2012 – leads the show "Pack the suitcase". March 2012 – Alexander becomes a judge in the show "Who is the top?". The presenters of the project, Olha Freimut and Sehiy Prytula, are jokingly called Pedan "voice from above", "the supreme judge", because Alexander is not in the frame and viewers only hear his voice.

Summer 2012 – along with Freimut and Prytula leads the show "CabrioLito".

On March 10, 2013, the informal and entertaining evening project "Pedan-Prytula Show" was launched on the Novyi Kanal. Pedan became the lead and creative producer of the show, along with Serhiy Prytula. Since 2014, he has been running the Heart of Three project, having spent three seasons of this show.

2014–2015 – Leading in two seasons of the program "Cheap and Anger". In the show, Alexander had a task with humor to look for savings in all spheres.

In 2016, along with Dmitry Tankovich, he was the presenter of the National Selection for Eurovision in 2016, where Jamala won. In the fall of 2016 began work on the project "Stars under hypnosis".

Television projects 

 Comedy Club UA
 "Uphill"
 "Make me funny"
 "Intuition"
 "Pack suitcase"
 "Who is on top?"
 "I am Hero!"
 Cabriolet
 Pedan-Prytula Shaw
 "Heart of Three 3"
 "Cheap and angry"
 "Eurovision-2016. Ukraine"
 "Stars under hypnosis"

Family 
 Father – Sergiy Yosypovych Pedan, head of the Podillya People's Dance Ensemble.
 Mother – Valentyna Nikolaevna Pedan, teacher at the university.
 The wife is Inna Pedan, a teacher of English at one of the high schools in Kyiv.
 Daughter – Valery, born March 25, 2005.
 Son – Mark, born December 26, 2016
For a while, while Alexander began his career in Kyiv, his wife live with her daughter in Khmelnitsky. Subsequently, Alexander called this period the most difficult time in family life.

Public activity 
 2015 became the author and creator of the project to the Mother's Day "ATO Soldiers read poetry to their mothers"
 2014 – Organized a concert on the Day of the Border Guard in the front-line zone
 2016 – together with Oleg Skrypka and Sergey Prytula, supported the social project "Hour of Code", in which, among other things, the children of 130 Ukrainian schools learned  IT programing.
 2018 – recording videos in support of Oleg Sentsov, a Ukrainian prisoner

Awards 
 2011 – Diploma nomination for Teletriumph in the nomination "morning broadcast" for the program "Rise"

References

External links 
 The site of Alexander
 Alexander on the site of the New Channel
 About wife and daughter
 The official Facebook page

Ukrainian male comedians
Ukrainian television presenters
Khmelnytskyi National University alumni
People from Khmelnytskyi, Ukraine
1982 births
Living people